Mayan-e Sofla, also known as Mayan-e Pain and Mayan Pain, may refer to:
 Mayan-e Sofla, East Azerbaijan
 Mayan-e Sofla, Razavi Khorasan